Elizabeth Smylie and Todd Woodbridge were the defending champions but they competed with different partners that year, Smylie with John Fitzgerald and Woodbridge with Nicole Provis.

Smylie and Fitzgerald lost in the second round to Elna Reinach and Christo van Rensburg.

Provis and Woodbridge lost in the quarterfinals to Manon Bollegraf and Tom Nijssen.

Bollegraf and Nijssen won in the final 6–2, 7–6(7–2) against Arantxa Sánchez Vicario and Emilio Sánchez.

Seeds
Champion seeds are indicated in bold text while text in italics indicates the round in which those seeds were eliminated.

Draw

Final

Top half

Bottom half

References
1991 US Open – Doubles draws and results at the International Tennis Federation

Mixed Doubles
US Open (tennis) by year – Mixed doubles